De Meinweg National Park (Nationaal Park De Meinweg) is a national park in Limburg, Netherlands. It is about 1800 hectares (7 sq. mi.) in size and was established in 1995.

In 2002 it became part of the Maas-Swalm-Nette park, a transboundary protected area on the German/Dutch border, covering 10,000 hectares (40 sq. mi.).

References

External links

 Official website

Protected areas established in 1995
1995 establishments in the Netherlands
Forests of the Netherlands
National parks of the Netherlands
Parks in Limburg (Netherlands)
Roerdalen